The 70th season of the Campeonato Gaúcho kicked off on February 4, 1990 and ended on July 29, 1990. Fourteen teams participated. Holders Grêmio won their 28th title. Aimoré and Novo Hamburgo were relegated.

Participating teams

System 
The championship would have three stages:

 First phase: The fourteen teams played each other in a double round-robin system. The two best teams in each round qualified to the Final quadrangular. If the same teams qualified in both stages, the teams with the best overall record advanced. The team with the best record won one bonus point to the final quadrangular.
 Final quadrangular: The four remaining teams played each other in a double round-robin system; the team with the most points won the title.

Championship

First phase

First round

Second round

Final standings

Playoffs 

|}

Final quadrangular

State Cups 

Two state cups, the Copa Cidade de Porto Alegre and the Copa Aneron Corrêa de Oliveira were slated to be disputed in the first semester of 1991 by the Second-level teams - the former for the clubs from the south of the state and the Porto Alegre region, and the latter for the clubs of the north of the state. However, once it was decided that the First level would be expanded to twenty clubs in 1991, these cups also became qualifiers for the first level.

In the Copa Cidade de Porto Alegre, the seventeen clubs were divided into two groups, one with eight and other with nine teams, in which the teams in a group played each other in a double round-robin format, with the two teams with the most points qualifying to the 1991 First level and to the Semifinals, the winners of which played each other to define the champions.

In the Copa Aneron Corrêa, the fifteen clubs were divided into two groups, one with eight and other with seven teams, in which the teams in a group played each other in a double round-robin format, with the four teams with the most points qualifying to the Second phase. In the second phase, the qualified teams in each group would play each other in a double round-robin format once more, with the best team of each group qualifying to the 1991 First level and to the Finals.

Copa Cidade de Porto Alegre

First phase

Group 1

Group 2

Semifinals 

|}

Finals 

|}

Copa Aneron Corrêa de Oliveira

First phase

Group A

Group B

Second phase

Group C

Group D

Finals 

|}

References 

Campeonato Gaúcho seasons
Gaúcho